Helen Frankenthaler (December 12, 1928 – December 27, 2011) was an American abstract expressionist painter. She was a major contributor to the history of postwar American painting. Having exhibited her work for over six decades (early 1950s until 2011), she spanned several generations of abstract painters while continuing to produce vital and ever-changing new work. Frankenthaler began exhibiting her large-scale abstract expressionist paintings in contemporary museums and galleries in the early 1950s. She was included in the 1964 Post-Painterly Abstraction exhibition curated by Clement Greenberg that introduced a newer generation of abstract painting that came to be known as color field. Born in Manhattan, she was influenced by Greenberg, Hans Hofmann, and Jackson Pollock's paintings. Her work has been the subject of several retrospective exhibitions, including a 1989 retrospective at the Museum of Modern Art in New York City, and been exhibited worldwide since the 1950s. In 2001, she was awarded the National Medal of Arts.

Frankenthaler had a home and studio in Darien, Connecticut.

Early life and education 
Helen Frankenthaler was born on December 12, 1928, in New York City. Her father was Alfred Frankenthaler, a New York State Supreme Court judge. Her mother, Martha (Lowenstein), had emigrated with her family from Germany to the United States shortly after she was born. Her two sisters, Marjorie and Gloria, were six and five years older, respectively. Growing up on Manhattan's Upper East Side, Frankenthaler absorbed the privileged background of a cultured and progressive Jewish intellectual family that encouraged all three daughters to prepare themselves for professional careers. Her nephew is the artist/photographer Clifford Ross.

Frankenthaler studied at the Dalton School under muralist Rufino Tamayo and also at Bennington College in Vermont. While at Bennington College, Frankenthaler studied under the direction of Paul Feeley, who is credited with helping her understand pictorial composition, as well as influencing her early cubist-derived style. Upon her graduation in 1949, she studied privately with Australian-born painter Wallace Harrison, and with Hans Hofmann in 1950.  She met Clement Greenberg in 1950 and had a five-year relationship with him. She later married Robert Motherwell, another painter, in 1958; the couple divorced in 1971. Both born of wealthy parents, they were known as "the golden couple" and for their lavish entertaining. She gained two stepdaughters from him, Jeannie Motherwell and Lise Motherwell. Jeannie Motherwell studied painting at Bard College and the Art Students League in New York. Continuing with her art after college, she became active in arts education at the Bruce Museum in Greenwich, CT, until relocating to Cambridge, MA, where she worked at Boston University for the graduate program in Arts Administration until 2015. She served on the Cambridge Arts Council Public Art Commission from 2004 - 2007 and is a member of the advisory board of Provincetown Arts magazine (since 2019). Jeannie Motherwell had a show at Rafius Fane Gallery, Boston, Mass. titled Pour, Push, Layer. She is currently represented by M Fine Arts Galerie in Boston, MA and The Schoolhouse Gallery in Provincetown, MA.

In 1994, Frankenthaler married Stephen M. DuBrul, Jr., an investment banker who served the Gerald Ford administration. Frankenthaler had been on the faculty of Hunter College.

Style and technique

Active as a painter for nearly six decades, Frankenthaler passed through many phases and stylistic shifts. Initially associated with abstract expressionism because of her focus on forms latent in nature, Frankenthaler is identified with the use of fluid shapes, abstract masses, and lyrical gestures. She made use of large formats on which she painted, generally, simplified abstract compositions. Her style is notable in its emphasis on spontaneity, as Frankenthaler herself stated, "A really good picture looks as if it's happened at once."

Frankenthaler's official artistic career was launched in 1952 with the exhibition of Mountains and Sea. Throughout the 1950s, her works tended to be centered compositions, meaning the majority of the pictorial incident took place in the middle of the canvas itself, while the edges were of little consequence to the compositional whole. In 1957, Frankenthaler began to experiment with linear shapes and more organic, sun-like, rounded forms in her works. In the 1960s, her style shifted towards the exploration of symmetrical paintings, as she began to place strips of colors near the edges of her paintings, thus involving the edges as a part of the compositional whole. With this shift in composition came a general simplification of Frankenthaler's style. She began to make use of single stains and blots of solid color against white backgrounds, often in the form of geometric shapes. Beginning in 1963, Frankenthaler began to use acrylic paints rather than oil paints because they allowed for both opacity and sharpness when put on the canvas. By the 1970s, she had done away with the soak stain technique entirely, preferring thicker paint that allowed her to employ bright colors almost reminiscent of Fauvism. Throughout the 1970s, Frankenthaler explored the joining of areas of the canvas through the use of modulated hues, and experimented with large, abstract forms. Her work in the 1980s was characterized as much calmer, with its use of muted colors and relaxed brushwork. "Once one's true talent begins to emerge, one is freer in a way but less free in another way, since one is a captive of this necessity and deep urge".

Color field painting

In 1960, the term color field painting was used to describe the work of Frankenthaler. In general, this term refers to the application of large areas, or fields, of color to the canvas. This style was characterized by the use of hues that were similar in tone or intensity, as well as large formats and simplified compositions, all of which are qualities descriptive of Frankenthaler's work from the 1960s onward. The color field artists differed from abstract expressionists in their attempted erasure of emotional, mythic, and religious content.

Technique
Frankenthaler often painted onto unprimed canvas with oil paints that she heavily diluted with turpentine, a technique that she named "soak stain." This allowed for the colors to soak directly into the canvas, creating a liquefied, translucent effect that strongly resembled watercolor. Soak stain was also said to be the ultimate fusing of image and canvas, drawing attention to the flatness of the painting itself. The major disadvantage of this method, however, is that the oil in the paints will eventually cause the canvas to discolor and rot away. The technique was adopted by other artists, notably Morris Louis (1912–1962) and Kenneth Noland (1924–2010), and launched the second generation of the color field school of painting.  Frankenthaler often worked by laying her canvas out on the floor, a technique inspired by Jackson Pollock.

Frankenthaler preferred to paint in privacy. If assistants were present, she preferred them to be inconspicuous when not needed.

Influences

One of her most important influences was Clement Greenberg (1909–1994), an art and literary critic with whom she had a personal friendship and who included her in the Post-Painterly Abstraction exhibition that he curated in 1964. Through Greenberg she was introduced to the New York art scene. Under his guidance she spent the summer of 1950 studying with Hans Hofmann (1880–1966), catalyst of the Abstract Expressionist movement.

The first Jackson Pollock show Frankenthaler saw was at the Betty Parsons Gallery in 1950. She had this to say about seeing Pollock's paintings Autumn Rhythm, Number 30, 1950 (1950), Number One,1950 (Lavender Mist) (1950):

It was all there. I wanted to live in this land.  I had to live there, and master the language. 

Some of her thoughts on painting:

John Elderfield wrote that the watercolors of Paul Cézanne and John Marin were important early influences:

Major works

Paintings
In Mountains and Sea, her first professionally exhibited work, Frankenthaler made use of the soak stain technique. The work itself was painted after a trip to Nova Scotia, which partly questions the extant of its non-representational status. Although Mountains and Sea is not a direct depiction of the Nova Scotia coastline, elements of the work suggest a kind of seascape or landscape, like the strokes of blue that join with areas of green. Much like Mountains and Sea, Frankenthaler's Basque Landscape (1958) seems to refer to a very specific, external environment, but it is also abstract. The same can be said for Lorelei (1956), a work based on a boat ride Frankenthaler took down the Rhine.

In Swan Lake #2 (1961), Frankenthaler begins to explore a more illustrative handling of paint. The work depicts a large area of blue paint on the canvas, with breaks in the color that are left white. These negative spaces resemble birds, perhaps swans, sitting on a body of water. There is a very rectilinear brown square that encompasses the blue, balancing both the cool tones of the blue with the warmth of the brown, and the gestural handling of the paint with the strong linearity of the square.

Eden, from 1956, is an interior landscape, meaning it depicts the images of the artist's imagination. Eden tells the story of an abstract, interior world, idealized in ways that a landscape never could be. The work is almost entirely gestural, save for the incorporation of the number "100" two times in the center of the image. When asked about the process of creating this work, Frankenthaler stated that she began by painting the numbers, and that a sort of symbolic, idealized garden grew out of that.

Prints and woodcuts
Frankenthaler recognized a need to continually challenge herself to develop as an artist. For this reason, in 1961, she began to experiment with printmaking at the Universal Limited Art Editions (ULAE), a lithographic workshop in West Islip, Long Island. Frankenthaler collaborated with Tatyana Grosman in 1961 to create her first prints.

In 1976, Frankenthaler began to work within the medium of woodcuts. She collaborated with Kenneth E. Tyler. The first piece they created together was Essence of Mulberry (1977), a woodcut that used eight different colors. Essence of Mulberry was inspired by two sources: the first was an exhibition of fifteenth century woodcuts that Frankenthaler saw on display at the Metropolitan Museum of Art, the second being a mulberry tree that grew outside of Tyler's studio. In 1995, the pair collaborated again, creating The Tales of Genji, a series of six woodcut prints. To create woodcuts with a resonance similar to Frankenthaler's painterly style, she painted her plans onto the wood itself, making maquettes. The Tales of Genji took nearly three years to complete. Frankenthaler then went on to create Madame Butterfly, a print that employed one hundred and two different colors and forty-six woodblocks. Madame Butterfly is seen as the ultimate translation of Frankenthaler's style into the medium of woodcuts, as it embodies her idea of creating an image that looks as if it happened all at once.

Awards and legacy
Frankenthaler received the National Medal of Arts in 2001. She served on the National Council on the Arts of the National Endowment for the Arts from 1985 to 1992. Her other awards include First Prize for Painting at the first Paris Biennial (1959); Temple Gold Medal, Pennsylvania Academy of Fine Arts, Philadelphia (1968); New York City Mayor's Award of Honor for Arts and Culture (1986); and Distinguished Artist Award for Lifetime Achievement, College Art Association (1994). In 1990, she was elected into the National Academy of Design as an Associate member, and became a full Academician in 1994.

Frankenthaler did not consider herself a feminist: "For me, being a 'lady painter' was never an issue. I don't resent being a female painter. I don't exploit it. I paint." "Art was an extremely macho business," Anne Temkin, chief curator at the Museum of Modern Art, told NPR. "For me, there's a great deal of admiration just in the courage and the vision that she brought to what she did." However, Mary Beth Edelson's feminist piece Some Living American Women Artists / Last Supper (1972) appropriated Leonardo da Vinci’s The Last Supper, with the heads of notable women artists including Frankenthaler collaged over the heads of Christ and his apostles. This image, addressing the role of religious and art historical iconography in the subordination of women, became "one of the most iconic images of the feminist art movement."

In 1953, Kenneth Noland and Morris Louis saw her Mountains and Sea which, Louis said later, was a "bridge between Pollock and what was possible." On the other hand, some critics called her work "merely beautiful." Grace Glueck's obituary in The New York Times summed up Frankenthaler's career:
Critics have not unanimously praised Ms. Frankenthaler's art. Some have seen it as thin in substance, uncontrolled in method, too sweet in color and too "poetic." But it has been far more apt to garner admirers like the critic Barbara Rose, who wrote in 1972 of Ms. Frankenthaler's gift for "the freedom, spontaneity, openness and complexity of an image, not exclusively of the studio or the mind, but explicitly and intimately tied to nature and human emotions.

Helen Frankenthaler Foundation 
The New York-based Helen Frankenthaler Foundation, established and endowed by the artist during her lifetime, is dedicated to promoting greater public interest in and understanding of the visual arts. In 2021 the foundation created Frankenthaler Climate Initiative. In July 2021, the foundation award the first round of grants totaling $5.1 million. The recipients included the Museo de Arte de Ponce, the Santa Rosa Indian Museum and Cultural Center, the Studio Museum in Harlem, and the Yale University Arts Center.

Exhibitions
Frankenthaler's first solo exhibition took place at the Tibor de Nagy Gallery, New York, in the fall of 1951. Her first major museum show, a retrospective of her 1950s work with a catalog by the critic and poet Frank O'Hara, a curator at the Museum of Modern Art, was at the Jewish Museum in 1960. Subsequent solo exhibitions include "Helen Frankenthaler," Whitney Museum of American Art, New York (1969; traveled to Whitechapel Gallery, London; Orangerie Herrenhausen, Hanover; and Kongresshalle, Berlin), and "Helen Frankenthaler: a Painting Retrospective," The Modern Art Museum of Fort Worth (1989–90; traveled to the Museum of Modern Art, New York; Los Angeles County Museum of Art; and Detroit Institute of Arts). Miles McEnery Gallery, a New York-based contemporary art gallery which exhibited Color-Field and Abstract Expressionist paintings, showcased a range of her work in 2009 "Helen Frankenthaler," December 10, 2019 – January 23, 2010). On October 6, 2019, Frankenthaler was included in Sparkling Amazons: Abstract Expressionist Women of the 9th St. Show at the Katonah Museum of Art in Westchester County, NY. which ran until January 26, 2020; *2019: "Postwar Women:alumnae of the Art Students League of New York 1945-1965", Phyllis Harriman Gallery, Art Students League of NY; curated by Will Corwin.; 2020: "9th Street Club", Gazelli Art House, London; curated by Will Corwin

In 2021, a decade after her death the New Britain Museum of American Art mounted an exhibition of her works on paper from the final stages of her opus titled "Helen Frankenthaler; Late Works 1990 - 2003". The exhibition is on from February 11 until May 23, 2021.

Collections
 Art Gallery of Ontario, Toronto
 Art Institute of Chicago
 Centre Pompidou, Paris
 The Governor Nelson A. Rockefeller Empire State Plaza Art Collection
 Kalamazoo Institute of Arts, Kalamazoo, MI
 Los Angeles County Museum of Art
 Metropolitan Museum of Art, New York
 Museum of Fine Arts, Boston
 Museum of Modern Art, New York
 National Gallery of Art, Washington, D.C.
 National Gallery of Australia
 San Francisco Museum of Modern Art
 Solomon R. Guggenheim Museum, New York
 Speed Art Museum, Louisville, KY
 Utah Museum of Fine Arts, Salt Lake City, UT
 University of Michigan Museum of Art, Ann Arbor, MI
 Walker Art Center, Minneapolis
 Whitney Museum of American Art, New York

National Endowment for the Arts
She was a presidential appointee to the National Council on the Arts, which advises the NEA's chairman. In The New York Times in 1989, she argued government funding for the arts was "not part of the democratic process" and was "beginning to spawn an art monster". According to the Los Angeles Times, "Frankenthaler did take a highly public stance during the late 1980s "culture wars" that eventually led to deep budget cuts for the National Endowment for the Arts and a ban on grants to individual artists that still persists. In a 1989 commentary for The New York Times, she wrote that, while "censorship and government interference in the directions and standards of art are dangerous and not part of the democratic process," controversial grants to Andres Serrano, Robert Mapplethorpe, and others reflected a trend in which the NEA was supporting work "of increasingly dubious quality. Is the council, once a helping hand, now beginning to spawn an art monster? Do we lose art ... in the guise of endorsing experimentation?"

Death
Frankenthaler died on December 27, 2011, at the age of 83 in Darien, Connecticut, following a long and undisclosed illness.

See also
 Lyrical abstraction
 Wash (visual arts)
 Sunset Corner

References

Further reading
 Alexander Nemerov. 2021. Fierce Poise: Helen Frankenthaler and 1950s New York. Penguin.
Elderfield, John. Helen Frankenthaler, 1989, Harry N. Abrams 
 Gabriel, Mary.  Ninth Street Women: Lee Krasner, Elaine de Kooning, Grace Hartigan, Joan Mitchell, and Helen Frankenthaler: five painters and the movement that changed modern art. New York: Little, Brown and Company, 2018
 Helen Frankenthaler, After Mountains and Sea: Frankenthaler 1956-1959 (New York : Guggenheim Museum, ©1998.) ,  
 Marika Herskovic, New York School Abstract Expressionists Artists Choice by Artists, (New York School Press, 2000.) . p. 16; p. 37; pp. 142–145, York 1986. 
 Pollock, Griselda, "Killing Men and Dying Women". In: Orton, Fred and Pollock, Griselda (eds), Avant-Gardes and Partisans Reviewed. London: Redwood Books, 1996. 
 Wilkin, Karen. Frankenthaler: Works on Paper 1949-1984, George Braziller (February 1985),

Bibliography
 Alison Rowley, Helen Frankenthaler: Painting History, Writing painting. I.B.Tauris Publishers, 2007.
 Helen Frankenthaler in Interview with Henry Geldzahler, in Theories and Documents of Contemporary Art, edited by Kristine Stiles and Peter Selz, Berkeley: University of California Press, 1996, pp. 28–30. 
 Helen Frankenthaler in 'Oral history Interview with Barbara Rose, 1968, for the Archives of American Art - Smithsonian Institution

External links

 Helen Frankenthaler Foundation
 Archives or American Art, Smithsonian Institute: Oral History Interview
 Video: Helen Frankenthaler at Turner Contemporary, Margate by Laura Bushell on Artinfo 4 March 2014
 Roberta Smith, "Two Artists Who Embraced Freedom" New York Times, 12/29/11
 Helen Frankenthaler Artwork Examples on AskART.
 "Frankenthaler's New Way of Making Art", The Wall Street Journal, November 8, 2008
  Helen Frankenthaler in the National Gallery of Australia's Kenneth Tyler Collection
 Helen Frankenthaler "Contemporary Experience Lecture" The Baltimore Museum of Art: Baltimore, Maryland, 1970  Accessed June 26, 2012
 Helen Frankenthaler in the Utah Museum of Fine Arts Collection

1928 births
2011 deaths
20th-century American painters
20th-century American printmakers
20th-century American women artists
Abstract expressionist artists
Abstract painters
American abstract artists
American people of German-Jewish descent
American women painters
American women printmakers
Art Students League of New York alumni
Bennington College alumni
Dalton School alumni
Hunter College faculty
Jewish American artists
Jewish painters
Members of the American Academy of Arts and Letters
Painters from New York City
People from the Upper East Side
People from Provincetown, Massachusetts
United States National Medal of Arts recipients
Honorary Members of the Royal Academy
21st-century American Jews
20th-century American Jews
21st-century American painters
21st-century American printmakers
21st-century American women artists